Gushi Kola (also Romanized as Gūshī Kolā; also known as Gūshtī Kolā) is a village in Talarpey Rural District, in the Central District of Simorgh County, Mazandaran Province, Iran. In 2006, its population was 309, in 88 families.

References 

Populated places in Simorgh County